is a Japanese actor, voice actor and narrator from Kanagawa Prefecture and a graduate of Waseda University who works for Aoni Production.

Among his other roles, he has performed the characters Hot Springs Emblem (Urusei Yatsura), Isao Ohta (Mobile Police Patlabor) and Kinnikuman Super Phoenix (Kinnikuman: Scramble for the Throne).

Filmography

Anime television series
1960s
Marine Boy (1969) – A Man
1970s
Animentari Ketsudan (1971) - Masami Maeda, Tatsuo Maki
Gekko Kamen (1972) – Jūrō Iwai
Aim for the Ace! (1973) – Ozaki
Space Battleship Yamato (1974) – Sukeharu Yabu
La Seine no Hoshi (1975) – Duke of Orléans
Tensai Bakabon (1975) – Unagi-Inu
Time Bokan (1975) – Robin Hood
Lupin III Part II (1977) – Gapelt
New Kyojin no Hoshi (1977) – Shigeo Nagashima
Yatterman (1977) – Red Three
Dokaben (1978) – Hayato Kagemaru
The Ultraman (1979) – Tajima
The Rose of Versailles (1979) – Nicholas
1980s
Ashita no Joe 2 (1980) – Harry Robert
Otasukeman (1980) – Hijikata Toshizo, Eliot Ness, Sherlock Holmes
Urusei Yatsura (1981) – Hot Springs Emblem, Akuma Belial
Attacker You! (1984) – Toshihiko Hazuki
Fist of the North Star (1984) – Soria, Baruda, Genshou, Cain
Animated Classics of Japanese Literature (1986) – Kobayashi-sensei
Ginga: Nagareboshi Gin (1986) – Akame
Saint Seiya (1986) – Black Phoenix, Crystal Saint
Dragon Ball (1987) – Akkuman
Metal Armor Dragonar (1987) – Genil
Transformers: The Headmasters (1987) – Sixshot, Double Cross, Trigger Happy, Platinum Tiger
Mobile Police Patlabor (1989) – Isao Ohta
Transformers: Victory (1989) – Greatshot
1990s
Getter Robo Go (1991) – Baron Yasha
Kinnikuman: Scramble for the Throne (1991) – Kinnikuman Super Phoenix/Phoenixman, Robin Mask, God of Intelligence
Hime-chan's Ribbon (1992) – Shigeo Gori
Kiteretsu Daihyakka (1992) – Vice Principal
Ghost Sweeper Mikami (1993) – Arnold
Sailor Moon Supers (1995) – Mawashitaro (ep. 143)
After War Gundam X (1996) – Barten
Detective Conan (1998) – Tamotsu Machida
The Big O (1999) – Rick Freizer
Crest of the Stars (1999) – Kyte
Master Keaton (1999) – Shinsuke's Father
2000s
Witch Hunter Robin (2002) – Takuma Zaizen
Full Metal Panic? Fumoffu (2003) – Kogure-sensei
Samurai 7 (2004) – Tessai
Sgt. Frog (2004) – Film Director
Darker than Black (2007) – Yoshimitsu Hourai
2010s
Blue Exorcist (2011) – A Buddhist Priest
Detective Conan (2017) – Koroku Hachitsuka
GeGeGe no Kitarō 6th series (2018) miage-nyūdō (eps 2, 19)

Original video animation (OVA)
Urusei Yatsura series (1985–2010) – Onsen Mark
Gall Force (1988) – Elison
Mobile Police Patlabor (1988) – Isao Ohta
Legend of the Galactic Heroes (1989) – Evans
Tsuki ga Noboru made ni (1991) - Father
Kamen Rider SD (1993) – Great Leader

Films
Urusei Yatsura series (1984–1991) – Onsen Mark
They Were 11 (1986) – Glenn Groff
Akira (1988) – Inspector, Council 
Patlabor: The Movie (1989) – Isao Ohta
Patlabor 2: The Movie (1993) – Isao Ohta
WXIII: Patlabor the Movie 3 (2002) – Isao Ohta

Video games
Forgotten Worlds (1992 PC Engine adaptation of the original arcade) (Red Soldier)
 Abalaburn Opening Narrator (xxxx) (Kleude's brother)
 Interlude (xxxx) (Sugiura)
 Ace Combat 5: The Unsung War (xxxx) (Oka Nieba, others)
 Mobile Police Patlabor ~Game Edition~ (xxxx) (Isao Ohta)
 Kinnikuman Muscle Grand Prix 2 (xxxx) (Kinnikuman Super Phoenix)
 Star Fox: Assault (2005) (General Pepper)
 Luminous Arc Infinity (2015) (Raji Sol)

Tokusatsu
Kamen Rider (1971) (voice of Scorpion man (Ep 3), Hitodenja (Ep 18), Zanburonzo (Ep 30), Armadillong (Ep 33), Gord Wolf Man Roar (Ep 39), Sunooman (Ep 40), Todogira (Ep 47), Jaguar man (Ep 53), Kabutolong (Ep 65), Shirakyurasu (Ep 74), Ganikoumoru (Ep. 78 & 79 only (Ep 80 Voice : Ryuji Nishizaki) ), Shocker Rider No. 1 (Ep 92-94), Garaox (Ep 95))
Kamen Rider X (1974) Movie: Five Riders vs. King Dark (voice of Riderman)
Kamen Rider Amazon (1974) (voice of Snail Beastman)
Kamen Rider Stronger (1975) (voice of Kikkaijin Armadillon, Yoroi Kishi, Cyrot)
Kamen Rider (Skyrider) (1979) (voice of Kamen Rider Stronger, Zougameron, Kamen Rider No. 1, Manto Kong, Ring Bear)
Kamen Rider Super-1 (1980) (voice of Amagansaa)
Birth of the 10th! Kamen Riders All Together!! (voice of Kamen Rider No. 1)
Ultraman Ace (1972) (voice of Ultra Seven)
Fireman (1973) (voice of Fireman) not mentioned in opening credits
Jumborg Ace (1974) (voice of Mad Gone, Jumborg Ace (eps. 26~50 only), Jumborg 9)
Barom-1 (1971) (voice of Umino (Actor : Ichirou Mizuki))
Emergency Orders 10-4 10-10 (1972) (voice of Communication)
Henshin Ninja Arashi (1972) (voice of Arashi, Fake Arashi, 卍 Kamaitachi)
Warrior Of Light Diamond Eye (1973) (voice of Diamond Eye)
Enban Sensō Bankid (1976) (voice of Lieutenant Tifun, Major General Byigomesu)
The Kagestar (1976) (voice of Todogilass, Rebirth Buffalo Guu)
Choujin Bibyun (1976) (voice of Kabenuri)
Battle Hawk (1976) (voice of Narrator)
The War in Space (1977) (voice of Jimmy (Actor : David Perin))
Megaloman (1979) (voice of Megaloman, Dagger/Shishido Hiroshi (Actor : Yuki Kitazume))
Kyodai Ken Byclosser (1985) (voice of Betobeto Man, Ring Goku)

Narration
Close-up Gendai (NHK)
The Sunday (NTV)
The Rekishi Retsuden: Soshite Kessaku ga Umareta (BS-TBS)

Dubbing

Live-action
Bedtime Stories – Barry Nottingham (Richard Griffiths)
The Empire Strikes Back (1980 Movie theater edition) - Zev Senesca (Christopher Malcolm)
The Final Countdown (1987 TV Asahi edition) – Lt. Cmdr. Kaufman (Lloyd Kaufman)
Five Children and It - Uncle Albert (Kenneth Branagh)
Ordinary People (1986 TV Asahi edition) – Joe Lazenby (Fredric Lehne)
Piranha II: The Spawning (1990 TV Asahi edition) – Mal the Cook (Arnie Ross)
Time Bandits (1988 TV Asahi edition) – Theatre Manager (Charles McKeown)
Transformers: The Last Knight – Sir Edmund Burton (Anthony Hopkins)

Animation
The Fox and the Hound – Tod
Sitting Ducks – Cecil

Accolades
Merit Award at the 16th Seiyu Awards (2022)

References

External links
Official agency profile 
Michihiro Ikemizu at GamePlaza-Haruka Voice Acting Database 
Michihiro Ikemizu at Hitoshi Doi's Seiyuu Database 

1943 births
Living people
Aoni Production voice actors
Japanese male video game actors
Japanese male voice actors
Male voice actors from Kanagawa Prefecture